"Not If You Were the Last Junkie on Earth" is a song by American rock band the Dandy Warhols. It was released on June 16, 1997, as the first single from their second studio album, ...The Dandy Warhols Come Down.

Background and content
As documented in the film Dig!, the song is dedicated to the band The Brian Jonestown Massacre, friends and rivals of The Dandy Warhols at the time, who in turn dedicated their own track "Not If You Were the Last Dandy on Earth" to them. Frontman Courtney Taylor-Taylor revealed in an interview that the song is also about his girlfriend at the time who, according to him, had become a heroin addict while he was on tour.

The song is known for its refrain "I never thought you'd be a junkie because heroin is so passé". Because of this, the song has often been erroneously titled "Heroin Is So Passé", although the song was later subtitled with this in some markets around the world.

Music video
The music video for the song, directed by David LaChapelle, features the group "playing among a troupe of dancing syringes" and was called an "arch, playful, taboo-shredding hoot" by Mojo.

Release
"Not If You Were the Last Junkie on Earth" was released in 1997 as the second single from ...The Dandy Warhols Come Down. It peaked at number 13 on the UK Singles Chart and number 31 on the US Billboard Alternative Songs chart.

Track listings
All tracks were written and composed by Courtney Taylor-Taylor except where indicated.

UK CD1
 "Not If You Were the Last Junkie on Earth"
 "Not If You Were the Last Junkie on Earth" (live)
 "It's a Fast Drivin' Rave Up with the Dandy Warhols Sixteen Minutes" (live)  – 7:17

UK CD2
 "Not If You Were the Last Junkie on Earth"
 "Genius" (live)
 "Ride" (live)

UK 7-inch single
A. "Not If You Were the Last Junkie on Earth"
B. "Genius" (live)

Australian CD single
 "Not If You Were the Last Junkie on Earth (Heroin Is So Passé)" – 3:12
 "One (Ultra Lame White Boy)" – 3:10
 "Head" – 3:16

Charts

Release history

References

External links
 
 

The Dandy Warhols songs
1997 singles
Capitol Records singles
Music videos directed by David LaChapelle
Songs about drugs
Songs about heroin
Songs written by Courtney Taylor-Taylor